Marthe Flandrin (1904–1987) was a French artist and painter, specializing in frescos, as at Saint-Hilaire-du-Harcouët, but also producing designs for mosaics and tapestries, such as her 1962 ceiling mosaics for Notre-Dame de la Trinité Basilica in Blois. She was the daughter of the architect Joseph Flandrin (1857–1939) and the artist Jeanne Train (1864–1947). Both her parents were from artistic families ― Joseph's father was the painter Paul Flandrin.

Bibliography
Dictionnaire Bénézit
Séverine Muteau, Josette Galiègue, Michèle Lefrançois, Marthe Flandrin, catalogue de l'exposition du musée d'art et d'histoire de la Ville d'Avranches, Éditions Gourcuff-Gradenigo, 2010, 206.p., 600 illustrations.

20th-century French painters
1904 births
1987 deaths